Massachusetts House of Representatives' 15th Essex district in the United States is one of 160 legislative districts included in the lower house of the Massachusetts General Court. It covers part of Essex County. Democrat Ryan Hamilton of Methuen has represented the district since 2023.

Locales represented
The district includes the following localities:
 part of Haverhill
 part of Methuen

The current district geographic boundary overlaps with that of the Massachusetts Senate's 1st Essex district.

Former locales
The district previously covered:
 Marblehead, circa 1872 
 part of Salem, circa 1872

Representatives

 George W. Butters, circa 1858-1859 
 Charles Henry Symonds, circa 1888 
 James D. Bentley, circa 1920 
 Cornelius Joseph Murray, circa 1951 
 Francis Joseph Bevilacqua, circa 1975 
 Larry Giordano
 Arthur Broadhurst
 Linda Dean Campbell, 2007-2023
 Ryan Hamilton, 2023-current

See also
 List of Massachusetts House of Representatives elections
 Other Essex County districts of the Massachusetts House of Representatives: 1st, 2nd, 3rd, 4th, 5th, 6th, 7th, 8th, 9th, 10th, 11th, 12th, 13th, 14th,  16th, 17th, 18th
 Essex County districts of the Massachusett Senate: 1st, 2nd, 3rd; 1st Essex and Middlesex; 2nd Essex and Middlesex
 List of Massachusetts General Courts
 List of former districts of the Massachusetts House of Representatives

Images

References

External links
 Ballotpedia
  (State House district information based on U.S. Census Bureau's American Community Survey).

House
Government of Essex County, Massachusetts